The 1957 UCLA Bruins football team was an American football team that represented the University of California, Los Angeles in the Pacific Coast Conference during the 1957 NCAA University Division football season. In their ninth and final year under head coach Red Sanders, the Bruins compiled an 8–2 record (5–2 in PCC, third).

UCLA's offensive leaders were quarterback Don Long with 479 passing yards, Chuck Kendall with 388 rushing yards, and Dick Wallen with 303 receiving yards.

Shortly before his tenth season in 1958, head coach Sanders died of a heart attack at age 53 in a Los Angeles hotel room on August 14.

Schedule

Personnel

Players
 Glen Almquist, end
 Tom Avery, tackle
 Barry Billington, fullback
 Dick Butler, center
 Craig Chudy, end
 Rod Cochran, guard
 John Davis, wingback
 Jim Dawson, tackle
 Bob Dinaberg, tackle
 Dennis Dressel
 Don Duncan, fullback
 Steve Gertsman, blocking back
 Joe Harper, guard
 Chuck Kendall, tailback
 Bill Leeka
 Kurt Lewin, guard
 Don Long, tailback
 Bill Mason, wingback/defensive halfback
 Paul Oglesby, tackle
 Phil Parslow, wingback
 Dan Peterson, center
 Dave Peterson, blocking back/linebacker
 Art Phillips, blocking back
 John Pierovich, end
 Dave Smith, tackle
 Ray Smith, sophomore fullback
 Jim Steffen, defensive end
 Jim Wallace, sophomore tackle
 Dick Wallen, end 
 Bob Weeden, sophomore center/tackle
 Clint Whitfield, guard
 Kirk Wilson, punter/tailback

Coaches
 Head coach - Red Sanders
 Assistant coaches - Deke Brackett, Sam Boghosian, Bill Barnes, Ray Nagel, George W. Dickerson, Johnny Johnson

Other personnel
 Head trainer - Ducky Drake
 Team physician - Dr. Bob Anderson

References

External links
 Game program: UCLA vs. Washington State at Spokane – November 9, 1957

UCLA
UCLA Bruins football seasons
UCLA Bruins football
UCLA Bruins football